The Anatori River is a small river in a remote part of Tasman District in the far northwest of the South Island of New Zealand.
The river mouth is accessible via a rough road down the west coast from Farewell Spit and Collingwood, the nearest town. There is a tiny settlement, Anatori, at the river mouth.

See also
List of rivers of New Zealand

References
Land Information New Zealand - Search for Place Names

Rivers of the Tasman District
Rivers of New Zealand